Ejike Camillus Anthony Ebenezer Mbaka known as Father Mbaka is a Catholic cleric, musician and the founder of Adoration Ministries, Enugu, Nigeria. He is noted for being one of the most prominent religious leaders in the south-eastern part of Nigeria.

Early life and background
Mbaka was born in Amata Ituku in Awgu Local Government Area of Enugu State, where he grew up with his family who were palm wine tappers.
He attended St. Vincent's Secondary School, Agbogugu in Awgu Local Government Area of Enugu State for his secondary education.

Priesthood
Mbaka attended Seat of Wisdom Seminary, Owerri, Imo State and St Joseph's Seminary Ikot Ekpene in Akwa Ibom State, where he was trained for priesthood.
On 29 July 1995, He was ordained a priest of the Roman Catholic Church, in the order of Melchizedek.

Controversies

Alleged support of Buhari in the 2015 general elections 

On 31 December 2014, Mbaka told a congregation that the then president Goodluck Ebele Jonathan had failed to stem the tide of insecurity and corruption in the country, and urged them to vote the administration out. Fr. Mbaka's call for a change in administration is in tandem with his priestly-prophetic ministry. Fr. Mbaka has been consistent in directing, advising and forewarning every administration in Nigeria since he was ordained a Roman Catholic priest.

Seeking compensation for supporting Buhari 
On 28 April 2021, Mbaka called on President Buhari to resign from his office over the worsening insecurities in Nigeria.
In response to Mbaka's call, the Nigerian Presidency released a statement through Garba Shehu that Mbaka is allegedly angry because President Buhari ignored his request for contracts after he asked for contracts as compensation for his support in 2015 and 2019.

Rumor of Rivalry with Ebube Muonso
It was once alleged that there occurred incidents of rivalry, but this false rumor was debunked by both the Reverend Fathers Mbaka and Emmanuel Obimma(Ebube Muonso).

References

Living people
Nigerian Roman Catholics
Nigerian clergy
Igbo people
People from Enugu
Year of birth missing (living people)